Tian Ran (born 8 January 1994) is a China former tennis player.

Tian has a career-high singles ranking of world No. 297, achieved on 24 October 2016. She also has a highest WTA doubles ranking of 212, achieved on 10 June 2013.

Tian made her WTA Tour main-draw debut at the 2011 Guangzhou International Women's Open partnering Liang Chen. In the first round, they defeated Alona Bondarenko and Mariya Koryttseva 4–6, 6–3, [12–10] before losing to the second seeds Alberta Brianti and Petra Martić in the quarterfinals.

ITF finals

Singles (3–2)

Doubles (7–9)

External links
 
 

1994 births
Living people
Chinese female tennis players
Tennis players from Henan
People from Zhengzhou
21st-century Chinese women